Kiên Giang is a province of Vietnam, located in the Mekong Delta region of southern Vietnam. It is known for fishing and rice farming. The provincial capital is Rạch Giá,  from Ho Chi Minh City.

Kiên Giang is bordered with An Giang province in the northeast, Cần Thơ and Hậu Giang provinces in the east, Bạc Liêu province in the southeast and Cà Mau province in the south, and Kampot province of Cambodia (with the  border) in the west, and the Gulf of Thailand in the southwest (with the  coast).

According to survey results on April 1, 2009, Kiên Giang province's population is 1,683,149 people.

History 
In 1774, Lord Nguyen Phuc Dang Khoat divided into 12 in the palace, but still leave the town of Hà Tiên, Mac Thien Tich style as Admiral rule.

By the reign of Minh Mạng, in 1832, Hà Tiên had become one of the six provinces of the south.

In 1876, Southern France divided into four big administrative regions, each region divided into smaller administrative sub-district or county take action (administratif arrondissement), Hà Tiên, the former being divided into two particle parameters are Hà Tiên and Rạch Giá. From January 1, 1900, two-particle parameters of Hà Tiên and Rạch Giá became provinces of Hà Tiên and Rạch Giá.

Hà Tiên and Rạch Giá were later merged into Kiên Giang. Kiên Giang had seven districts at the time: Hà Tiên, Kiên An, Kiên Bình, Kiên Lương, Kiên Tân, Kiên Thành and Phú Quốc.

Geography

General 
 Coordinates: 9°23'50" N to 10°32'30" N, 104°40' E to 105°32'40" E.
Forests cover  (19% of the area). The province also contains  of unused land.

Climate 
 Average annual rainfall: 
 Average temperature: 
 The dry season occurs for approximately three months and the rest of the year is mostly the wet season
 Dry season: from seven to eight hours/day.
 Rainy Season: from four to six hours/day.
 Average relative humidity: 80 to 83%.

Administrative divisions 
Kiên Giang is subdivided into 13 district-level sub-divisions and two cities:

 12 districts:
 An Biên
 An Minh
 Châu Thành
 Giang Thành
 Giồng Riềng
 Gò Quao
 Hòn Đất
 Kiên Hải Island
 Kiên Lương
 Tân Hiệp
 Vĩnh Thuận
 U Minh Thượng

 3 cities:
 Phú Quốc Island
 Hà Tiên
 Rạch Giá (capital)

They are further subdivided into 12 commune-level towns (or townships), 118 communes, and 15 wards.

References

External links

Official website
 
Travel to Ha Tien Kien Giang

 
Gulf of Thailand
Provinces of Vietnam